Marie Nademlejnská (27 June 1896 – 24 January 1974) was a Czech actress. She starred in the 1969/1970 film Witchhammer under director Otakar Vávra.

Selected filmography
 Ladies in Waiting (1940)
 The Girl from Beskydy Mountains (1944)

References

External links

Czech film actresses
1894 births
1974 deaths
20th-century Czech actresses
Actresses from Prague